Lee Yong-mun (born July 7, 1995) is a wushu taolu athlete from South Korea.

Career 
Lee made his international debut at the 2013 World Wushu Championships where he became world champion in nanquan (compulsory). Two years later, he won a silver medal in nangun at the 2015 World Wushu Championships. At the 2017 World Wushu Championships, he won a silver and bronze medal in duilian and nangun respectively. He then won the bronze medal in men's nanquan at the 2018 Asian Games. His most recent competition was at the 2019 World Wushu Championships where he was a silver medalist in duilian.

Personal life 
Lee's brother, Lee Yong-hyun, is also a highly skilled wushu athlete.

See also 

 List of Asian Games medalists in wushu

References

External links 
Athlete profile at the 2018 Asian Games

1995 births
Living people
South Korean wushu practitioners
Wushu practitioners at the 2014 Asian Games
Wushu practitioners at the 2018 Asian Games
Asian Games bronze medalists for South Korea
Asian Games medalists in wushu
Medalists at the 2018 Asian Games